Jean André Devaux (4 August 1894 – 28 February 1981) was a French sprinter. In 1914 he won the national 400 m title, and in 1920 he was part of the French 4 × 400 m relay that won an Olympic bronze medal. He missed the 1924 Games due to an injury.

Devaux was an inspector of postal services and telecommunications and an accomplished writer, the author of 1954 book La Gerbe et le Fagot.

References

External links
 
 

1894 births
1981 deaths
French male sprinters
Olympic bronze medalists for France
Athletes (track and field) at the 1920 Summer Olympics
Olympic athletes of France
Medalists at the 1920 Summer Olympics
Olympic bronze medalists in athletics (track and field)
People from Laon
Sportspeople from Aisne
19th-century French people
20th-century French people